Leftvents are small, deep-sea lophiiform fish comprising the family Linophrynidae distributed throughout tropical to subtropical waters of all oceans.

The name of the type genus Linophryne has been translated from the Greek to mean "toad that fishes with a net", an allusion to the fishes' impressive use of mimicry in luring prey. One of several families of anglerfishes, the Linophrynidae are not well studied, and only one species is given a common name: the netdevil, Borophryne apogon. For this reason, the name "netdevil" can sometimes refer to any linophrynid.

Description 
With roughly spherical to slightly elongated, gelatinous, and scaleless bodies and large triangular heads, leftvents possess a body plan typical of deep-sea anglerfish. In females only, long, sharp fang-like teeth line the jaws of a cavernous maw. An illicium (a modified dorsal spine; the "fishing rod") — and an esca (a bulbous, bioluminescent "fishing lure") are present, also in females only. The illicium is shorter and the esca larger and complex compared to those found in some other anglerfish families, and its conformation is unique to each species. Most distinctively, Linophryne (the most diverse genus) possess greatly elongated and highly complex hyoid (chin) barbels: these barbels are forked (with three to five main branches) and may be longer than the standard length of the fish, trailing below it in a tree-like manner. Sessile bioluminescent organs are also present on the branches of this barbel.

The complexity and length of the hyoid barbel varies widely among species, with some having no forkings. In Haplophryne, barbels are absent altogether, and the illicium is reduced to a rounded flap.

Symbiotic bacteria belonging to the family Vibrionaceae are responsible for the luminescence; the strain of bacteria is apparently different in each species. The bacteria are believed to originate from the surrounding seawater and colonise the organs via external ducts. The light produced is bluish to greenish, and the host female presumably has some control over its production.

Like other deep-sea anglers, leftvents have watery flesh and poorly ossified bones; the skin, which in females is a dark brown to black in life (but colourless in Haplophryne), is extremely fragile and abrades with ease. Males are more or less colourless. Females possess strong sphenotic and preopercle spines and highly distensible stomachs. Males, other than lacking lures, barbels, and (in most species) jaw teeth, have larger olfactory organs and tubular eyes; short and stout denticular teeth are also present.

The pelvic fins and pelvic bone are absent in both sexes; the present fins are small and rounded. The dorsal fin and anal fin are of roughly equal size, both positioned far back from the head, and retrorse.

Life history 
Few details are known of their life history: mature females are poor swimmers and likely remain motionless much of the time, waiting for both mates and prey to approach their lures. The female's distensible stomach permits the ingestion of a wide variety of prey (lanternfish are a common catch), even prey larger than the anglerfish herself. The diminutive males do not feed following their  metamorphosis from larval to adult form: they are obligate parasites and exist only to provide sperm to females. Males are believed to be attracted to females by the latter's species-specific lures and pheromones, on which the males home in with the help of their oversized olfactory organs and eyes.

Once a female is located, the male latches onto her with his otherwise useless teeth. Through enzymatic processes, the tissues of the male gradually begin to coalesce with the tissues of the female, resulting in a permanent attachment and a shared circulatory system, forming a hermaphroditic chimera. The development of the male's large testes — which was delayed prior to this point — begins, and all other organs in the male's body degenerate. Several males may thus attach to the same female with no apparent ill effects befalling her.

Leftvents are presumed not to be guarders (that is, they do not care for eggs after release), with females releasing buoyant eggs into the water, which become part of the zooplankton; these may be contained within gelatinous rafts. The larvae remain near the shallower limits of the mesopelagic zone where they presumably feed on plankton and marine snow. The larval epidermis is greatly inflated; this may help the larvae maintain neutral buoyancy. Upon metamorphosis, the fish descend to deeper water. Males likely outnumber females by a wide margin, and physically mature more quickly, though as noted above they do not mature sexually until they attach to a female.

Fossil record
A fossil of what may be Linophryne indica was found in Late Miocene strata of Los Angeles, California, along with a fossil of the related Borophryne apogon, during the construction of a metrorail in 1993.

At least two fossils of Acentrophryne longidens have been found in Late Miocene-aged limestone from Rosedale, California.

References

 
 "Review of the deep-sea anglerfishes (Lophiiformes: Ceratioidei) of southern Africa". M. Eric Anderson and Robin W. Leslie. February 2005 version. J.L.B. Smith Institute of Ichthyology.
 "Marine microlights: the luminous marine bacteria". Peter Herring. February 2005 version. Microbiology Today, Vol. 29., November 2002.

Linophrynidae
Deep sea fish
Extant Miocene first appearances